The Albert Canal is a  canal located in northeastern Belgium, which was named for King Albert I of Belgium. The Albert Canal connects Antwerp with Liège, and also the Meuse river with the Scheldt river.

Size and geography
To allow four-stacked container traffic, bridges over the canal are currently being heightened to allow for a  overhead.

During most of the 1930s, before the completion of the Albert Canal, it took about seven days to travel from Antwerp to Liège by water. In the 21st century, that same distance can be covered in about 18 hours.

History

The Albert Canal was constructed from 1930 through 1939. The German construction company Hochtief AG worked on the canal between 1930 and 1934, but it was completed by Belgian companies. The Albert Canal was used for the first time in 1940 but, because of World War II and the German occupation, intensive use only began later, in 1946.

During World War II, the Albert Canal functioned as a defence line. The crossing of the canal by the German forces and the destruction of Fort Eben-Emael on 11 May 1940 was a milestone in the German invasion of Belgium.

During the Liberation of Belgium by the Allies in September 1944, the Second Canadian Division was the first Allied unit to cross the Albert Canal. The British Army also crossed the Albert Canal on its way north across Belgium and into the Netherlands and the U.S. Army entered Belgium further to the east on its way to liberate the rest of Belgium, and Luxembourg, and then proceed east to invade Nazi Germany. Hence, Belgium was liberated from the south by three different armies, two of which needed to cross the Albert Canal.

Today

In 2002, the canal carried a record 43 million tons of goods of various kinds, amounting to more than half the Belgian waterway total.

The canal is also a popular leisure and cycling destination, with well paved service roads on both sides traversing picturesque farm land, particularly around Smeermaas, Lanaken and Maasmechelen.

Notes

1930s in Belgium
Canals opened in 1939
Canals in Flanders
Canals in Antwerp Province
Canals in Limburg (Belgium)
Geography of Antwerp
Transport in Antwerp